Events from the year 1770 in Scotland.

Incumbents

Law officers 
 Lord Advocate – James Montgomery
 Solicitor General for Scotland – Henry Dundas

Judiciary 
 Lord President of the Court of Session – Lord Arniston, the younger
 Lord Justice General – Duke of Queensberry
 Lord Justice Clerk – Lord Barskimming

Events 
 12 April – Monkland Canal authorized.
 9 March – Haggis is served on board Captain James Cook's ship , anchored off New Zealand, in celebration of the birthday of a Scottish officer on board, Cook himself having a Scottish father.
 14 November – Scottish explorer James Bruce is shown the source of the Blue Nile in Ethiopia.
 Emigrants from the Highland Clearances in the Hebrides migrate to Prince Edward Island, and to Glasgow where the Gaelic-speaking congregation of St Columba Church of Scotland is formed.
 Montgomery's Entail Act remedies the system of short leases on agricultural properties.
 Plans for improvement of the harbour at Dundee proposed by John Smeaton and Glasgow Town Council begins deepening the navigable River Clyde.
 Approximate date
 Bridge at Bridge of Weir constructed at Burngill.
 Harbour at Charlestown, Fife, begun by Charles Bruce, 5th Earl of Elgin.
 The Fordell Railway constructed in Fife.

Births 
 2 February – George Gordon, 5th Duke of Gordon, nobleman, soldier and politician (died 1836 in London)
 c. 25 March – Alexander Carse, genre painter (died 1843)
 18 April – William Nicol, geologist (died 1851)
 9 December (bapt.) – James Hogg, "the Ettrick Shepherd", poet and novelist (died 1835)

Deaths 
 c. January – William Falconer, poet and marine dictionary compiler (born 1732; lost at sea)
 27 July – Robert Dinwiddie, colonial Governor of Virginia (born 1693; died in Virginia)
 1 November – Alexander Cruden, Biblical scholar (born 1699; died in London)
 9 November – John Campbell, 4th Duke of Argyll, Whig politician (born c. 1693)
 5 December – James Stirling, mathematician (born 1692)
 Approximate date – Alasdair mac Mhaighstir Alasdair, Gaelic poet (born c. 1698)

The arts
 David Dalrymple's anthology of Ancient Scottish Poems is published.

See also 

Timeline of Scottish history

References 

 
Years of the 18th century in Scotland
Scotland
1770s in Scotland